Lita dela Rosa (died July 1994) was a Filipino 4-time World champion in Tenpin Bowling from Cebu, Philippines. She was posthumously inducted in the World Bowling Hall of Fame and in the Philippine Sports Hall of Fame in 2018.

Career

World tournaments 
Lita won the AMF Bowling World Cup in Bogota, Colombia, in 1978. In 1979 IX Fédération Internationale des Quilleurs World Championship that was held in Manila, Philippines (at the Celebrity Sports Plaza), she won the gold medal in Women Single, as well as the prestigious Masters title. She won another gold medal in Women Doubles teamed up with country woman Bong Coo, and added another silver medal in Trios with Coo and Nellie Castillo.

Dela Rosa is only one of two women who have won the AMF Bowling World Cup and the FIQ/WTBA Masters in successive years (the other is Annette Hagre Johansson of Sweden (1986 AMF Bowling World Cup, 1987 FIQ/WTBA Masters)).

In the following world championships in 1983 X Fédération Internationale des Quilleurs held in Caracas Venezuela, Lita, Bong Coo and Arianne Cerdeña took another crack at the Trios but tied with the United States team for the silver medal.

Dela Rosa is a recipient of government incentives as a past achiever per R.A. 9064 through the Philippine Sports Commission.

Asian tournaments
In the 1979 5th FIQ Asian Zone Championships at Ploenshit Bowling Center in Bangkok, Lita combined with Nellie Castillo for the Women Doubles Gold medal.

International and National Hall of Fame
She was posthumously elected to the WBW International Bowling Hall of Fame in 2000  and posthumously inducted in the Philippine Sports Hall of Fame with compatriots Rafael "Paeng" Nepomuceno and Olivia "Bong" Coo on October 12, 2019.

Duckpin
Dela Rosa was also one of the best Duckpin bowlers in the Philippines, also having won the silver medal at the World Cup of Duckpin.

Death
She died in July 1994, at the age of 57, following a heart bypass operation. She was honored by the Government Service Insurance System (GSIS) for faithfully serving it for 32 years. She retired in April 1994 with the rank of Technical Assistant in the GSIS Manpower Development Division.

References

Year of birth missing
1994 deaths
Filipino ten-pin bowling players
Asian Games medalists in bowling
Bowlers at the 1978 Asian Games
Sportspeople from Cebu
Asian Games gold medalists for the Philippines
Asian Games silver medalists for the Philippines
Asian Games bronze medalists for the Philippines
Medalists at the 1978 Asian Games
Date of death missing
Philippine Sports Hall of Fame inductees
Southeast Asian Games medalists in football
Southeast Asian Games gold medalists for the Philippines
Southeast Asian Games silver medalists for the Philippines
Southeast Asian Games bronze medalists for the Philippines